Yangwei was a cruiser built for the Imperial Chinese Navy. She was built by Charles Mitchell & Company in Newcastle Upon Tyne, England, from a design by Sir George Wightwick Rendel which had already been used on the Chilean Navy vessel  (later the Imperial Japanese Navy's ). Both would serve together throughout their careers, assigned to the Beiyang Fleet and based in Taku during the summer, and Chemulpo, Korea, in the winter.

Yangwei did not see any action during the Sino-French War, but in the First Sino-Japanese War, she was in the Chinese line at the Battle of Yalu River on 17 September 1894. She was set alight by combined fire from the Japanese fleet, and drifted south out of the battle until running aground on a reef. She was subsequently destroyed by a spar torpedo from a boat of the Japanese cruiser .

Design
The design for Yangwei was advertised by its designer, British naval architect Sir George Wightwick Rendel, as an example of a low-cost cruiser able to withstand larger ironclad warships. The design was later seen as an intermediate concept between his flat-iron gunboats and the protected cruiser. In theory, the ship would rely on its small size and higher speed, along with a higher muzzle velocity main battery to attack larger, less maneuverable ships.

Yangweis basic design was initially used on the Chilean Navy vessel , which preceded it in construction, although several changes were made, including increasing the number of steam boilers from four to six. Both Yangwei and her sister ship, the  shared the same design, and were built by British shipbuilder Charles Mitchell on the River Tyne near Newcastle Upon Tyne. Mitchell had worked alongside Rendel, and was building Arturo Prat. The ships were manned by 140 crew.

The prow was reinforced for ramming. They had a number of technical innovations, including hydraulic steering systems and electrical incandescent light fixtures. The main armaments were breech-loading Armstrong  cannons, one on the bow and one on the stern, mounted in stationary gun shields. These shields were added for weather proofing reasons, but restricted the angle of fire that could be taken, as well as the elevation they could fire at. Both ships were equipped with two pinnaces, which were each armed with spar torpedoes.

Career
Chinese diplomat Li Hongzhang was made aware of Rendel's designs, and following the start of the construction on Arturo Prat, an order was placed on behalf of the Imperial Chinese Navy for two ships of the same type. Yangwei was laid down on 15 January 1880, and launched on 29 January 1881. Yangwei was subsequently worked up, and was announced as completed on 14 July that year. They were completed ahead of Arturo Prat, who instead would enter service as the Imperial Japanese Navy's  after Chile cancelled the order following the end of the War of the Pacific.

Each of the Chinese vessels were equipped with Chinese crews, with Western captains and instructors in place. They sailed out of the Tyne River on 9 August, and stopped in Plymouth Sound two days later where Admiral Ding Ruchang joined them to take command of the ships for the journey to China. Following their arrival on 20 October in Hong Kong, they toured Canton (now Guangzhou) and Shanghai, before travelling to the Taku Forts. Chaoyong was boarded by Hongzhang, and the two cruisers took the diplomat to inspect the dredging of the port at Taku (now the Port of Tianjin). Both ships were assigned to the Beiyang Fleet in the north, and Ruchang was placed in command.

On 23 June 1884, Yangwei was present alongside Chaoyong, as well as the corvette  and the sloop , when the Chinese vessels met their French Navy counterparts. The French ships dwarfed their Chinese counterparts, and following a discussion between the leaders of each fleet, the French put on a firing demonstration. Afterwards, the Chinese fleet broke up with Yang-Wu headed to Foochow (now Fuzhou), and the two cruisers sailed back to Taku. The Sino-French War broke out shortly afterwards, although Yangwei saw no action, there was speculation that the two cruisers might be sent to break the French blockade of Formosa. She and Chaoyong were sent south to Shanghai in November, but were then brought back north after concerns were raised about growing Japanese influences in Korea.

Battle of Yalu River

Following the war, Chaoyong and Yangwei continued to operate together. They operated out of Taku, but since the water froze over during winter, they would spend that part of the year in the Korean port of Chemulpo (now Incheon). During the First Sino-Japanese War in 1894, Yangwei remained with the fleet and was supporting troop transports when they made contact with a Japanese fleet on the morning of 17 September.

As the Japanese fleet moved in, the Chinese fleet moved away from anchor and attempted for form up in a line. However, the manoeuvre was botched and Yangwei was one of four ships which ended up behind the others. This was due to a lack of maintenance over the years; with their equipment out of date they could barely make . Orders had been given for the ships to operate in pairs, with Yangwei and Chaoyong teamed together. This battle plan was alien to the premise of their design, inherent in the lack of armour for ships about to fight in the line of battle.

Within a few minutes, fires broke out on both ships, which quickly engulfed the central superstructures with its numerous wooden partitions covered with thick layers of flammable varnish applied over the years. Yangwei fought no more, and eventually beached on a reef several miles south with the loss of the majority of her crew. The morning following the battle, she was destroyed by a spar torpedo from a boat of the Japanese cruiser . The Japanese fleet had kept their distance, only sending in their smaller boats to investigate, fearing a counterattack by the Chinese using torpedoes.

Notes

References

 

 

 
 

 

Tsukushi-class cruisers
Ships built on the River Tyne
1881 ships
First Sino-Japanese War cruisers of China
Naval ships of China
Cruisers of the Beiyang Fleet
Chaoyong-class cruisers
Shipwrecks in the Yellow Sea
Sino-French War naval ships
Shipwrecks of China